"The Life You Save May Be Your Own" is a short story by the American author Flannery O'Connor. It is one of the 10 stories in her short story collection A Good Man Is Hard to Find, published in 1955.

Plot summary 
An elderly woman and her daughter sit quietly on their porch at sunset when Mr. Shiftlet comes walking up the road to their farm. Through carefully selected details, O'Connor reveals that the girl is deaf and mute, that the old woman views Shiftlet as 'a tramp,' and that Shiftlet himself wears a "left coat sleeve that was folded up to show there was only half an arm in it." The old woman's name is Lucynell Crater, and her daughter is also named Lucynell. The two adults exchange curt pleasantries, then Mrs. Crater offers him shelter in exchange for work but warns, "I can't pay." Shiftlet says he has no interest in money, adding that he believes that most people are too concerned with money. Sensing not only a handyman but a suitor for her daughter, Mrs. Crater asks if Shiftlet is married, to which he responds, "Lady, where would you find you an innocent woman today?" Mrs. Crater then makes known her love for her daughter, adding, "She can sweep the floors, cook, wash, feed the chickens, and hoe." Mrs. Crater is clearly offering her daughter's hand to Shiftlet. For the moment, however, he simply decides to stay on the farm and to sleep in the broken-down car. Once Shiftlet moves into the Craters' farm, he fixes a broken fence and hog pen, teaches Lucynell how to speak her first word ("bird"—a recurring symbol in O'Connor's fiction), and, most importantly, repairs the automobile. At this time Mrs. Crater gives her daughter's hand in marriage over to Mr. Shiftlet, but he declines saying, "I can't get married right now, everything you want to do takes money and I ain't got any."

Mrs. Crater, in her desperation to marry off her daughter, offers him a sum of money to marry Lucynell. He then accepts and agrees to marry her. Soon after, the three take the car into town and Lucynell and Shiftlet are married. After the wedding Shiftlet and Lucynell go on their honeymoon. They stop in a restaurant and have dinner. There Lucynell falls asleep. Once she is sound asleep on the counter of the diner, Shiftlet gets up out of his seat and begins to leave. The boy behind the counter looks at the girl and then back at Shiftlet in a confused manner. Seeing how beautiful Lucynell is, the boy exclaims, "She looks like an angel of Gawd". Shiftlet then replies "Hitchhiker" and abandons her at the restaurant. Afterwards Shiftlet "was more depressed than ever" and he "kept his eye out for a hitchhiker." As a storm is breaking in the sky, Shiftlet sees a road sign that reads, "Drive carefully. The life you save may be your own." Shiftlet then offers a ride to a boy who did not even have his thumb out.

Shiftlet tries to make conversation, telling stories about his sweet mother, who is—as the boy at the diner called Lucynell—"an angel of Gawd." But the boy rejects Shiftlet's moral. "My old woman is a flea bag and yours is a stinking polecat," he snaps, before leaping from the car. Shocked, Shiftlet "felt the rottenness of the world was about to engulf him," exclaiming, "Oh Lord! Break forth and wash the slime from the earth!" The rain finally breaks, with a "guffawing peal of thunder from behind and fantastic raindrops, like tin-can tops, crashed over the rear of Mr. Shiftlet's car." Shiftlet speeds off to Mobile, Alabama.

Themes
As in several other O'Connor stories, such as "A Good Man Is Hard to Find" and "Good Country People," in "The Life You Save May Be Your Own" a malevolent stranger intrudes upon the lives of a family with destructive consequences. Tom Shiftlet has been compared to The Misfit in "A Good Man is Hard to Find"; however, Shiftlet remains primarily a comic character and does not embody The Misfit's spiritual dimensions.

Adaptation 

In 1957, the story was adapted into a television production on the Schlitz Playhouse of Stars, starring Gene Kelly.

See also
"The Love You Save"

References

External links
 The Life You Save May Be Your Own at Internet Archive

Short stories by Flannery O'Connor
1955 short stories
Southern Gothic short stories